Atatürk High School of Science, Istanbul is the second high school of science in Turkey, which was founded by a presidential directive and under the legislation of the High School of Science Project in 1982. Atatürk High School of Science is a co-educational, boarding high school located in Kuyubaşı, Kadıköy, Istanbul next to the Marmara University.

Since its first alumni graduated in 1985, İAFL has been an institution that has made significant contributions in building up Turkey's future. İAFL alumni are all over the world as well as Turkey having distinguished themselves in various fields, such as engineering, medical, natural and social sciences.

Immedietally after its establishment,  İAFL has become one of the most reputable high schools in Turkey with its confident, socially active graduates in line with Atatürk's ideals, who possess exceptional skills and received excellent  education in the fields of basic sciences and mathematics.

İAFL's main aim is to educate students who will fulfill Turkey's need for scientists, engineers and medical doctors in Turkey. To achieve this goal, İAFL successfully preserved its foundations and created a model for other Turkish high schools to follow. One measure of İAFL's success is its students' accomplishments in national (e.g. Ulusal Bilim Olimpiyatları) and international competitions (e.g. International Mathematical Olympiad, International Physics Olympiad) in science, mathematics and informatics.

İAFL teachers are selected through a series of tests and are from the most successful in their respective areas of teaching in Turkey. They are not only excellent tutors for the students but also teach them how to think analytically and trained in the methods of scientific questioning. In the first two years, students go through intensive science and math courses which cover the  three year national high-school curriculum. During their final year, they take advanced courses to help them pursue their knowledge on research projects that they would like to participate in and to advance their freshmen courses at university. The curriculum also enables the students to pass the nationwide University Entrance Exam supervised by YÖK.

Foreign language education is taken as seriously as science courses at İAFL. When the students enter the school, they take a test to determine their level of language in English, German and French; and each student will attend to at least one of these courses.

Each class has no more than 30 students, which enables students' active participation and discussion. The laboratories and the library resources supplement the course work providing practical knowledge in addition to students' theoretical information on the respective subject. Physics, chemistry, biology, computer and language laboratories are equipped with up-to-date material and are also available to students outside class hours as well.

Outside class hours, the smart and ambitious students take the opportunity to share their ideas, practice teamwork and learn about friendship. As a boarding school, IAFL provides a well established opportunity for the students make lifelong friends and learn self-discipline.

The 300 person capacity dining lounge, sports facilities, relaxation rooms and the canteen are all easily accessed with connections through buildings.

For leisure time the school supports social clubs, managed by students themselves, that arrange local or national visits to popular locations, theatrical events and concerts.

The 600-seat theatre hall gives the students the opportunity to put on amateur plays. There is a conference room facility in the main building for special occasions. During their leisure times, students benefit from the sports ground with its football, basketball, volleyball opportunities.

The Music Room is available to those who wish to pursue their interest in music. Students represent IAFL at the annual interscholastic "Milliyet Muzik Yarismalari" competition in popular music.

The parents association, "Koruma Dernegi", stands by the school management to support the school and its students in all aspects.

After the four years of intensive education, every graduate of IAFL may be a member of the Atatürk High School of Science, Istanbul Alumni Association (AFLİM). The alumni society aims to bring together and continue the communication among the graduates through social events and to do so, organizes new year celebration dinners, barbecue gatherings annually. AFLİM also supports the students by bridging between the graduates and the students, providing scholarships for the high school and university students. 

Every year, IAFL graduates ambitious students who are not only successful in academics, but who have learned how to participate in all areas of life. The graduates' success in Turkey and around the world has been and will continue to be the proof of the school's high quality.

References

External links
Atatürk High School of Science, Istanbul
AFLİM, Atatürk High School of Science, Istanbul Alumni Association

Media

High schools in Istanbul
Educational institutions established in 1982
1982 establishments in Turkey
Kadıköy
High School of Science, Istanbul
Science High Schools in Turkey